The Coeur d'Alene Press (or CDA Press) is a daily newspaper based in Coeur d'Alene, Idaho, United States. It is owned by the Hagadone Media Group and the flagship property of the Idaho Hagadone News Network. The Press provides local coverage for Kootenai County, Idaho.

The Coeur d'Alene Press is available six days per week in print (except Monday) and seven days per week online. Their offices in Coeur d'Alene are also home to one of two audio recording studios in the Idaho Hagadone News Network.

History 

Joseph T. Scott published the first issue of the Coeur d'Alene Press on February 20, 1892. In his salutation, Scott stated "The people of Kootenai County are here for a purpose: Nature has placed before them crude material for building up a prosperous and wealthy community... and the Press proposes to be one of the factors in this development."

At its inception, The Press identified itself as an "independent Republican paper, supporting the principles of that party so long as it holds to present doctrines". It was published weekly on Saturdays as four pages with seven columns, but by 1906, it published ten pages of content. This prompted Scott to make the paper a daily on August 6, 1906. He described the Press as "broad gauge independent, but not neutral by this time".

The Coeur d'Alene Press, originally published on weekdays and Saturdays, ran until 1929. On November 18, 1907, its name was changed to the Coeur d'Alene Evening Press. The latter appeared daily, except Sundays. In 1929, its name reverted to the Coeur d'Alene Press.

Burl Hagadone was named publisher of the newspaper in 1936, and purchased half of Scripps Newspapers Inc., stock in the newspaper in April 1946. His son Duane succeeded him as publisher in an agreement with Scripps Publishing. In May 1976, Scripps and Hagadone severed their partnership and Hagadone took ownership of six newspapers including the Coeur d'Alene Press.

References

External links 
 

Newspapers published in Idaho
Coeur d'Alene, Idaho
Daily newspapers published in the United States
1892 establishments in Idaho
Newspapers established in 1892